Ovsyannikovo is a rural locality (a village) in Babayevsky District, Vologda Oblast, Russia. Population:

References 

Rural localities in Babayevsky District